The Ultra Maratón Caballo Blanco (also known as the Copper Canyon Ultramarathon, CCUM, or Ultra Caballo Blanco) is a 50-mile ultramarathon held annually in the town of Urique, in the northern Mexican state of Chihuahua.

Recognized internationally as the Copper Canyon Ultramarathon through author Christopher Mcdougall's book Born to Run, in honor and memory of Micah True "El Caballo Blanco" after his passing in 2012, the race was returned to the name by which it was always known in the Canyons, "Ultra Marathon Caballo Blanco.".

The Ultra Marathon Caballo Blanco is conducted by the Municipality of Urique with support by the 501(c)(3) nonprofit True Messages] and long time ‘Mas Locos’, sponsors and supporters. The UMCB has an incredible and storied history and is considered one of Ultra Marathon Running’s must-do bucket list events. Started by Micah to introduce international athletes to the beauty of the Raramuri (Tarahumara) people, their great culture, and their magical lands, each year the event brings together endurance athletes from all over the planet to run together with over 800 Raramuri athletes. 
 
In 2017 a Marathon distance (42K), and in 2019 a Half Marathon (21K) was added to the event options for those wanting to experience all the beauty of this cultural and running event but not quite ready for the 50 mile distance. Both the 42K and 21K are still incredibly challenging events with climbs and with what is typically a very warm day.

HISTORY

Created by Micah True the first Ultra Caballo Blanco was run on 2003 and initiated as an act of Korima (the circle of sharing, and act of giving without expectation of return, what I have is yours).  This tenet of love and caring remains today and in addition to supporting the cultural aspects of running ane health and all the other wonderful results of the experience, it continues the tradition of providing vouchers awards for all Raramuri runners that are used for nutritional sustenance (maize flour, beans, rice, etc) for their families.

The 2006 race, which included runners like Scott Jurek, Jenn Shelton and Christopher McDougall, was novelized by McDougall as part of his 2009 book Born to Run.

The event has continued to grow throughout the years.  What started as one man’s dream and a few local Tarahumara athletes, now annually attracts over 1200 endurance runners from over 20 countries.  In addition, UMCB week also includes the ‘Caballitos Runs’. These age based races for younger runners take place on Saturday and are surely a highlight of the week.  Over 800 young athletes compete for awards and prizes and just plain fun.  In addition to helping continue the running traditions with the youth, the events also support the kids with a party, and donations from sponsors and the community to make for a day these young ones look forward to all year long.

The race is now run in 50 mile, 26.2 mile, and 13.1 mile formats, and will be run again on March 4–5, 2023.

References

Ultramarathons